Vincent Bessat (born 8 November 1985) is a French footballer who plays as a left-back for Apollon Limassol.

Career
Born in Lyon, Bessat began his career with Toulouse where he was promoted to the reserve team in summer 2004. After 32 games and 4 goals for the reserves of Toulouse he left the Midi-Pyrénées to sign for Louhans-Cuiseaux. He played two years for Louhans-Cuiseaux and then signed a three years contract with Metz. On 11 June 2010, Boulogne signed the midfielder on a two-year contract from Metz. He played for Nantes from 2011 to 2015, before joining Caen in June 2015.

References

External links
 Profile at L'Équipe

1985 births
Living people
French footballers
Louhans-Cuiseaux FC players
Association football midfielders
FC Metz players
US Boulogne players
FC Nantes players
Stade Malherbe Caen players
Ligue 1 players
Ligue 2 players